Cyperus lupulinus, the Great Plains flatsedge, is a plant species native to North America. It is widespread across southeastern Canada and the central and northeastern United States as far west as Wyoming, Colorado and New Mexico, with more isolated populations reported in Washington (Asotin County), Idaho (Idaho County) and Oregon (Wallowa County). It grows in open, sun-lit locations such as fields, prairies, roadsides, farms, etc.

Description
Cyperus lupulinusis a perennial herb up to 50 cm tall, spreading by means of underground rhizomes. Culms are triangular in cross-section. Spikes are densely clustered into a more or less spherical clump. Achenes are dark brown, almost black, egg-shaped, about 2 mm across.

Taxonomy
Two subspecies are accepted:

Cyperus lupulinus subsp. lupulinus - Floral scales greater than 2.5 mm, not clasping achenes; spikelets with 5-22 scales each
Cyperus lupulinus subsp. macilentus (Fernald) Marcks - Floral scales less than 2.5 mm, clasping achenes; spikelets with 3-7 scales each

See also
List of Cyperus species

References

lupulinus
Plants described in 1807
Flora of Canada
Flora of the United States